Carmeltazite is a rare oxide mineral.  Its first discovery on Earth was announced in 2019, after it was found in Zebulun Valley in Israel. The chemical formula for carmeltazite is ZrAl2Ti4O11.

The International Mineralogical Association's Commission on New Minerals and Mineral Names approved the registration of the mineral under application 2018-103. The name is a combination of the location it was found (Mount Carmel) and the major elements (titanium, aluminium and zirconium). It has properties similar to Allendeite.

References

Oxide minerals
Zirconium minerals